The Bride with White Hair is a 1993 Hong Kong wuxia film directed by Ronny Yu, starring Brigitte Lin and Leslie Cheung.

The film's main character, Lian Nichang, is loosely based on the protagonist of Liang Yusheng's novel Baifa Monü Zhuan, which served as source material for the 1982 film Wolf Devil Woman. However, Yu saw the film as a Romeo and Juliet story and said that the lovers' struggle against fate and their heroic duty inspired him more than the familiar trappings of most wuxia films. As such, the film departs significantly from the original source.

A sequel, The Bride with White Hair 2, directed by David Wu, was released later in the same year.

Plot
Zhuo Yihang was raised by Taoist Ziyang of the Wudang School and groomed to be a chivalrous swordsman. He is tasked with leading a coalition force formed by the eight major orthodox martial arts schools to counter an evil cult.

During a battle against the cult, Zhuo Yihang meets a young woman, Lian Nichang, and falls in love with her. She is an orphan and was raised by wolves as an infant before being adopted by Ji Wushuang, the conjoined twins who lead the cult. After consummating their romance, Lian Nichang decides to leave the cult and follow Zhuo Yihang in pursuit of an ordinary life away from the martial artists' community.

Lian Nichang succeeds in leaving the cult after suffering great pains. Meanwhile, Zhuo Yihang returns to Wudang and is horrified to see that his fellows have been murdered. The coalition members believe that Lian Nichang is responsible so they attack her when she arrives to meet Zhuo Yihang. Zhuo Yihang is forced to turn against Lian Nichang.

Devastated by her lover's betrayal, Lian Nichang morphs into a vicious white-haired killer and slays all the coalition members present. Suddenly, Ji Wushuang appears and reveals that he/she is actually the one who killed the Wudang members. Zhuo Yihang and Lian Nichang join forces to defeat and kill Ji Wushuang. However, even after the victory, Lian Nichang vows never to forgive Zhuo Yihang for betraying her and walks away while he looks on helplessly.

In a brief epilogue set years later, Zhuo Yihang is alone in a remote mountain region guarding a rare flower that is said to bloom only once every several decades and has the ability to reverse the effects of ageing (turning white hair back to dark). Believing that it can cure the harm he has inflicted on Lian Nichang, he awaits for the return of his loved one and hopes that she will show up.

Cast

Production
Ronny Yu was described as being "virtually unknown" outside of Hong Kong until the release of The Bride With White Hair. Among the crew, Yu hired cinematographer Peter Pau and Japanese costume designer Emi Wada, who had previously won an Oscar for her costume work on Akira Kurosawa's Ran. Yu commented getting both these people difficult as investors "couldn't understand why we should put so much money to hire these people. I must add that they were worth every penny." Yu described their costumes as a combination of Eastern and Western influences. Yu has rarely contributed to his own screenplays, but co-wrote the film with David Wu, Jason Lam Kee-To and Bik-Yin Tang.

The film was shot in two months. Yu stated the film was shot "in a rush, because I was obliged to release it in mid-August".

Release
The Bride with White Hair was released in August 1993 in Hong Kong. The film grossed a total of $ HK20 million in Hong Kong. A sequel, The Bride with White Hair 2 was released December 1993. Yu's involvement in the second film was credited as a producer, but described his role as "supporting my editor David Wu, who was directing his first movie".

The Bride With White Hair won an award at the Avoriaz Fantasy Festival.

Reception
Terry Lawson writing for Dayton Daily News gave the film a three out of four star rating, praising the film stating that "Fantasy movies are rarely as truly fantastic as The Bride with White Hair" and that it contained "incredible derring-do and stunts" as well as being "elaborately choreographed and photographed with both passion and precision". Lawson also praised the acting of Leslie Cheung and Brigitte Lin. Kevin Thomas praised the film as "period martial arts fantasy at its most romantic" that is "genuinely poignant as well as with and amusing", concluding that the film "is fun, lively, yet exquisitely tender, suffused, finally with a sweet sadness". The film was listed among an unranked Top 10 films of the year by Matt Zoller Seitz of the Dallas Observer. Derek Elley of Variety proclaimed the film "cuts a classy swath" in "the crowded market of Hong Kong costume actioners" noting that it "has a broad-spanned, darkly tragic atmosphere that sets it apart from regular, effects-heavy fare". Steve Biodrowski of the film magazine Imagi-Movies placed the film as the second best film of 1995, declaring it "the best fantasy to emerge from Hong Kong since Tsui Hark launched the current wave" and that it was "visually elaborates every nuance for maximum emotional impact".

From retrospective reviews, Rob Mackie of The Guardian reviewed the film on its home video release in the United Kingdom in 2001, praising the film as "sumptuous and completely berserk" with "lighting, colours and costumes put you in sensual overload" as well as being "quite sexy in places, as well as showing occasional evidence of a sense of humor-often the missing link in Asian melodrama". Elizabeth Kerr of the Hollywood Reporter wrote about the film in 2018, describing the film as "an effortless pre-'97 allegory as well as a visually immersive and sensuous martial arts drama for the ages" and a "feverish romance that remains burned into all of our minds 25 years later. Lin’s sexual ambiguity and Cheung’s vague androgyny upend expectations of movie couples to brilliant effect, while simultaneously demonstrating what real screen chemistry looks like. When Lin finally lets loose with her legendary death stare, it’s only slightly more intense than the eroticism that preceded it". John Charles, in his book The Hong Kong Filmography gave the film a ten out of ten rating, referring to the film as the "key [Hong Kong] fantasy of the '90s thus far", and proclaimed it as "the most visually resplendent graceful and romantic films the genre has produced in some time" while noting that "although the one of the story varies, the visuals are always abundantly colorful, possessing a shading and natural texture that is in keeping with the flordi standards of Chinese fantasy while also displaying darker and more contemporary stylistics".

Accolades

References

Sources

External links
 
 
 
 

1993 films
1990s adventure films
Hong Kong fantasy adventure films
1990s romantic fantasy films
Wuxia films
Martial arts fantasy films
Works based on Baifa Monü Zhuan
Films based on Baifa Monü Zhuan
Films directed by Ronny Yu
1990s Hong Kong films